Gazimağusa District (or Επαρχία Αμμοχώστου) is a district of the de facto state of Northern Cyprus It is divided into three sub-districts: Mağusa Sub-district, Akdoğan Sub-district and Geçitkale Sub-district. Its capital is Famagusta.

Its population was 69,838 in the 2011 census. The current Governor is Beran Bertuğ. İskele District was separated from Gazimağusa (Famagusta) District in 1998.

See also
 Districts of Cyprus
Districts of Northern Cyprus

References

 
Districts of Northern Cyprus